The Texas Rangers finished the 2004 season in 3rd place in the West division of the American League. Five Rangers were All Stars, Francisco Cordero, Kenny Rogers, Hank Blalock, Michael Young and All-Star Game MVP Alfonso Soriano.

Offseason
 October 8, 2003: Tony Mounce was released by the Rangers.
 November 19, 2003: Ken Huckaby was signed as a free agent with the Texas Rangers.
February 5, 2004: Mike Lamb was traded by the Texas Rangers to the New York Yankees for Jose Garcia (minors).
 February 16, 2004: Alex Rodriguez was traded by the Texas Rangers with cash to the New York Yankees for a player to be named later and Alfonso Soriano. The New York Yankees sent Joaquin Arias (April 23, 2004) to the Texas Rangers to complete the trade.

Regular season

Opening Day starters
Gerald Laird, C
Mark Teixeira, 1B
Alfonso Soriano, 2B
Hank Blalock, 3B
Michael Young, SS
David Dellucci, LF
Laynce Nix, CF
Kevin Mench, RF
Brad Fullmer, DH
Kenny Rogers, LHP

Season summary
May 8: Alfonso Soriano set a club record with six hits in nine innings in a 16–15, 10-inning victory over the Detroit Tigers.  The game featured an hour-long fifth inning: up by two runs entering the inning, Detroit scored eight runs in the top half of the inning to take a ten run lead over the Rangers; the Rangers would score ten runs in the bottom half of the inning to tie the game (the largest deficit ever overcome by the Rangers and tying an MLB record for most runs in an inning by two teams).
October 1: In a game against the Texas Rangers, Ichiro Suzuki set an MLB record for most hits in one season.

Season standings

Record vs. opponents

Notable transactions
July 6, 2004: Ken Huckaby was selected off waivers by the Baltimore Orioles from the Texas Rangers.
August 18, 2004: Ken Huckaby was signed as a free agent with the Texas Rangers.

Roster

Game log

|- style="background-color:#ffbbbb"
| 1 || April 5 || @ Athletics || 5-4 || Bradford (1-0) || Nelson (0-1) || Rhodes (1) || 45,122 || 0-1
|- style="background-color:#ffbbbb"
| 2 || April 6 || @ Athletics || 3-1 || Mulder (1-0) || Park (0-1) || Rhodes (2) || 13,217 || 0-2
|- style="background-color:#bbffbb"
| 3 || April 7 || @ Athletics || 2-1 || Lewis (1-0) || Zito (0-1) || Cordero (1) || 20,232 || 1-2
|- style="background-color:#bbffbb"
| 4 || April 9 || Angels || 12-4 || Dickey (1-0) || Ortiz (0-1) || || 50,370 || 2-2
|- style="background-color:#bbffbb"
| 5 || April 10 || Angels || 12-6 || Rogers (1-0) || Lackey (0-1) || || 30,331 || 3-2
|- style="background-color:#ffbbbb"
| 6 || April 11 || Angels || 7-2 || Colón (2-0) || Park (0-2) || || 18,209 || 3-3
|- style="background-color:#bbffbb"
| 7 || April 12 || Angels || 7-6 || Almanzar (1-0) || Washburn (1-1) || Cordero (2)|| 18,156 || 4-3
|- style="background-color:#ffbbbb"
| 8 || April 13 || Athletics || 10-9 || Zito (1-1) || Callaway (0-1)|| Rhodes (4) || 20,112 || 4-4
|- style="background-color:#ffbbbb"
| 9 || April 14 || Athletics || 9-4 || Redman (1-0) || Dickey (1-1) || || 24,093 || 4-5
|- style="background-color:#bbffbb"
| 10 || April 15 || Athletics || 7-2 || Rogers (2-0) || Harden (0-1) || || 22,605 || 5-5
|- style="background-color:#bbffbb"
| 11 || April 16 || @ Mariners || 5-0 || Park (1-2) || Meche (0-2) || || 35,647 || 6-5
|- style="background-color:#ffbbbb"
| 12 || April 17 || @ Mariners || 4-1 || Moyer (1-1) || Lewis (1-1) || Guardado (1) || 38,925 || 6-6
|- style="background-color:#ffbbbb"
| 13 || April 18 || @ Mariners || 4-2 || Piñeiro (1-1) || Ramirez (0-1) || Guardado (2) || 35,182 || 6-7
|- style="background-color:#bbffbb"
| 14 || April 20 || @ Angels || 6-3 || Rogers (3-0) || Ortiz (0-2) || Cordero (3)|| 33,892 || 7-7
|- style="background-color:#bbffbb"
| 15 || April 21 || @ Angels || 4-1 || Dickey (2-1) || Lackey (0-3) || Cordero (4)|| 36,689 || 8-7
|- style="background-color:#ffbbbb"
| 16 || April 22 || @ Angels || 7-5 || Colón (3-1) || Park (1-3) || Percival (3) || 30,725 || 8-8
|- style="background-color:#bbffbb"
| 17 || April 23 || Mariners || 10-8 || Drese (1-0) || Piñeiro (1-2) || Cordero (5) || 28,020 || 9-8
|- style="background-color:#bbffbb"
| 18 || April 24 || Mariners || 3-0 || Powell (1-0) || García (0-1) || Nelson (1) || 28,479 || 10-8
|- style="background-color:#bbffbb"
| 19 || April 25 || Mariners || 14-6 || Almanzar (2-0) || Franklin (1-1) || || 31,110 || 11-8
|- style="background-color:#bbffbb"
| 20 || April 27 || @ Royals || 3-2 || Dickey (3-1) || Affeldt (0-2) || Cordero (6) || 15,529 || 12-8
|- style="background-color:#ffbbbb"
| 21 || April 28 || @ Royals || 5-3 || Gobble (1-0) || Rogers (3-1) || MacDougal (1) || 15,530 || 12-9
|- style="background-color:#bbffbb"
| 22 || April 29 || @ Royals || 9-7 || Almanzar (3-0) || Leskanic (0-3) || Cordero (7) || 13,663 || 13-9
|- style="background-color:#bbbbbb"
| -- || April 30 || colspan=6|Postponed || 13-9

|- style="background-color:#bbffbb"
| 23 || May 1 || Red Sox || 4-3 || Ramirez (1-1) || Malaska (1-1) || Cordero (8) || N/A || 14-9
|- style="background-color:#bbffbb"
| 24 || May 1 || Red Sox || 8-5 || Benoit (1-0) || Martínez (3-2) || Cordero (9) || 44,598 || 15-9
|- style="background-color:#bbffbb"
| 25 || May 2 || Red Sox || 4-1 || Dickey (4-1) || Tim Wakefield (2-1) || Cordero (10) || 31,538 || 16-9
|- style="background-color:#bbffbb"
| 26 || May 3 || Devil Rays || 9-0 || Rogers (4-1) || Abbott (2-3) || || 18,116 || 17-9
|- style="background-color:#ffbbbb"
| 27 || May 4 || Devil Rays || 5-4 || Carter (1-1) || Nelson (0-2) || Báez (3) || 20,228 || 17-10
|- style="background-color:#bbffbb"
| 28 || May 5 || Devil Rays || 6-1 || Drese (2-0) || Waechter (1-2) || || 21,082 || 18-10
|- style="background-color:#ffbbbb"
| 29 || May 7 || Tigers || 8-7 || Levine (3-2)  || Ramirez (1-2) || Urbina (3) || 41,095 || 18-11
|- style="background-color:#bbffbb"
| 30 || May 8 || Tigers || 16-15 || Cordero (1-0)  || Urbina (1-1) || || 45,017 || 19-11
|- style="background-color:#ffbbbb"
| 31 || May 9 || Tigers || 5-3 || Robertson (2-2) || Rogers (4-2) || Urbina (4) || 25,034 || 19-12
|- style="background-color:#bbffbb"
| 32 || May 11 || @ Devil Rays || 5-4 || Ramirez (2-2) || Waechter (1-3) || Cordero (11) || 10,389 || 20-12
|- style="background-color:#bbffbb"
| 33 || May 12 || @ Devil Rays || 9-8 || Park (2-3) || Halama (0-1) || Cordero (12) || 10,202 || 21-12
|- style="background-color:#ffbbbb"
| 34 || May 13 || @ Devil Rays || 6-3 || Hendrickson (2-3) || Dickey (4-2) || Báez (4) || 10,234 || 21-13
|- style="background-color:#ffbbbb"
| 35 || May 14 || @ Tigers || 7-1 || Knotts (1-0) || Benoit (1-1) || Yan (2) || 22,449 || 21-14
|- style="background-color:#bbffbb"
| 36 || May 15 || @ Tigers || 6-1 || Rogers (5-2) || Robertson (2-3) || || 26,120 || 22-14
|- style="background-color:#ffbbbb"
| 37 || May 16 || @ Tigers || 3-1 || Johnson (2-5) || Drese (2-1) || Urbina (6) || 21,615 || 22-15
|- style="background-color:#ffbbbb"
| 38 || May 18 || Royals || 7-6 || Sullivan (3-0) || Dickey (4-3) || Field (1) || 26,247 || 22-16
|- style="background-color:#ffbbbb"
| 39 || May 19 || Royals || 5-3 || Gobble (2-2) || Park (2-4) || Huisman (1) || 32,374 || 22-17
|- style="background-color:#bbffbb"
| 40 || May 20 || Royals || 6-3 || Rogers (6-2) || May (1-6) || Cordero (13) || 25,149 || 23-17
|- style="background-color:#bbffbb"
| 41 || May 21 || Yankees || 9-7 || Benoit (2-1) || Brown (5-1) || Cordero (14) || 49,195 || 24-17
|- style="background-color:#bbffbb"
| 42 || May 22 || Yankees || 4-3 || Almanzar (4-0) || Gordon (1-2) || || 49,458 || 25-17
|- style="background-color:#ffbbbb"
| 43 || May 23 || Yankees || 8-3 || Vázquez (4-4) || Dickey (4-4) || || 50,241 || 25-18
|- style="background-color:#bbffbb"
| 44 || May 25 || @ White Sox || 7-4 || Rogers (7-2) || Schoeneweis (4-2) || Cordero (15) || 22,359 || 26-18
|- style="background-color:#ffbbbb"
| 45 || May 26 || @ White Sox || 4-0 || Loaiza (6-3) || Benoit (2-2) || || 18,185 || 26-19
|- style="background-color:#ffbbbb"
| 46 || May 27 || @ White Sox || 9-0 || Buehrle (5-1) || Drese (2-2) || || 14,428 || 26-20
|- style="background-color:#ffbbbb"
| 47 || May 28 || @ Blue Jays || 5-4 || Lilly (3-2) || Dickey (4-5) || Frasor (3) || 16,394 || 26-21
|- style="background-color:#ffbbbb"
| 48 || May 29 || @ Blue Jays || 6-2 || Batista (3-4) || Dominguez (0-1) || || 30,704 || 26-22
|- style="background-color:#bbffbb"
| 49 || May 30 || @ Blue Jays || 4-2 || Rogers (8-2) || Miller (1-1) || Cordero (16) || 22,225 || 27-22

|- style="background-color:#bbffbb"
| 50 || June 1 || @ Indians || 6-5 || Ramirez (3-2) || White (2-1) || Cordero (17) || 17,136 || 28-22
|- style="background-color:#bbffbb"
| 51 || June 2 || @ Indians || 5-3 || Almanzar (5-0) || Betancourt (2-4) || Cordero (18) || 18,098 || 29-22
|- style="background-color:#ffbbbb"
| 52 || June 4 ||  @ Yankees || 7-6 || Brown (7-1) || Powell (1-1) || Rivera (22) || 49,372 || 29-23
|- style="background-color:#bbffbb"
| 53 || June 5 ||  @ Yankees || 8-1 || Dominguez (1-1) || Lieber (4-3) ||  || 51,910 || 30-23
|- style="background-color:#ffbbbb"
| 54 || June 6 ||  @ Yankees || 2-1 || Mussina (7-4) || Drese (2-3) || Rivera (23) || 54,092 || 30-24
|- style="background-color:#bbffbb"
| 55 || June 7 || Pirates || 6-5 || Cordero (2-0) || Johnston (0-3) ||  || 25,286 || 31-24
|- style="background-color:#bbbbbb"
| -- || June 8 || colspan=6|Postponed ||
|- style="background-color:#bbbbbb"
| -- || June 9 || colspan=6|Postponed ||
|- style="background-color:#bbffbb"
| 56 || June 10 || Pirates || 9-7 || Francisco (1-0) || Meadows (2-2) || Cordero (19) || N/A || 32-24
|- style="background-color:#bbffbb"
| 57 || June 10 || Pirates || 10-4 || Rogers (9-2) || Fogg (3-5) ||  || 27,219 || 33-24
|- style="background-color:#ffbbbb"
| 58 || June 11 || Cardinals || 12-7 || Suppan (6-5) || Dominguez (1-2) ||  || 32,962 || 33-25
|- style="background-color:#bbffbb"
| 59 || June 12 || Cardinals || 7-2 || Drese (3-3) || Carpenter (7-2) ||  || 42,173 || 34-25
|- style="background-color:#ffbbbb"
| 60 || June 13 || Cardinals || 3-2 || Williams (4-6) || Dickey (4-6) ||  || 41,087 || 34-26
|- style="background-color:#ffbbbb"
| 61 || June 15 || @ Reds || 5-4 || Jones (5-1) || Ramirez (3-3) ||  || 36,501 || 34-27
|- style="background-color:#ffbbbb"
| 62 || June 16 || @ Reds || 7-4 || Norton (1-2) || Francisco (1-1) ||  || 39,114 || 34-28
|- style="background-color:#ffbbbb"
| 63 || June 17 || @ Reds || 4-3 || Van Poppel (3-2) || Drese (3-4) || Graves (27) || 40,383 || 34-29
|- style="background-color:#bbffbb"
| 64 || June 18 || @ Marlins || 8-1 || Wasdin (1-0) || Penny (6-5) ||  || 20,506 || 35-29
|- style="background-color:#bbffbb"
| 65 || June 19 || @ Marlins || 7-6 || Dickey (5-6) || Willis (6-4) || Cordero (20) || 31,021 || 36-29
|- style="background-color:#bbffbb"
| 66 || June 20 || @ Marlins || 4-2 || Mahay (1-0) || Koch (0-1) ||  || 23,643 || 37-29
|- style="background-color:#bbffbb"
| 67 || June 22 || Mariners || 10-2 || Drese (4-4) || Nageotte (1-3) ||  || 32,364 || 38-29
|- style="background-color:#bbffbb"
| 68 || June 23 || Mariners || 6-3 || Bierbrodt (1-0) || Franklin (3-5) || Cordero (21) || 30,418 || 39-29
|- style="background-color:#bbffbb"
| 69 || June 24 || Mariners || 9-7 || Shouse (1-0) || Moyer (6-3) ||  || 26,266 || 40-29
|- style="background-color:#bbffbb"
| 70 || June 25 || Astros || 3-1 || Rogers (10-2) || Miller (7-7) ||  || 46,088 || 41-29
|- style="background-color:#bbffbb"
| 71 || June 26 || Astros || 8-7 || Almanzar (6-0) || Miceli (3-3) || Cordero (22) || 40,131 || 42-29
|- style="background-color:#ffbbbb"
| 72 || June 27 || Astros || 1-0 || Oswalt (6-6) || Drese (4-5) || Lidge (4) || 43,328 || 42-30
|- style="background-color:#bbffbb"
| 73 || June 28 || @ Mariners || 8-5 || Rodríguez (1-0) || Franklin (3-6) || Cordero (23) || 28,253 ||43-30
|- style="background-color:#ffbbbb"
| 74 || June 29 || @ Mariners || 4-3 || Piñeiro (4-8) || Benoit (2-3)  || Guardado (15) || 34,844 || 43-31
|- style="background-color:#bbffbb"
| 75 || June 30 || @ Mariners || 9-6 || Rogers (11-2) || Nageotte (1-4) || Cordero (24) || 32,754 || 44-31

|- style="background-color:#ffbbbb"
| 76 || July 1 || @ Mariners || 8-4 || Blackley (1-0) || Wasdin (1-1) || || 35,966 || 44-32
|- style="background-color:#ffbbbb"
| 77 || July 2 || @ Astros || 7-5 || Oswalt (7-6) || Almanzar (6-1) || Lidge (5) || 41,897 || 44-33
|- style="background-color:#ffbbbb"
| 78 || July 3 || @ Astros || 10-8 || Weathers (6-4) || Brocail (0-1) || Miceli (1) || 42,889 || 44-34
|- style="background-color:#bbffbb"
| 79 || July 4 || @ Astros || 18-3 || Benoit (3-3) || Pettitte (4-2) || || 41,147 || 45-34
|- style="background-color:#bbffbb"
| 80 || July 5 || @ Indians || 8-5 || Rogers (12-2) || Sabathia (5-4) || Cordero (25) || 25,363 || 46-34
|- style="background-color:#ffbbbb"
| 81 || July 6 || @ Indians || 4-1 || Lee (8-1) || Bierbrodt (1-1) || Riske (3) || 16,796 || 46-35
|- style="background-color:#bbffbb"
| 82 || July 7 || @ Indians || 9-8 || Mahay (2-0) || Robertson (1-1) || Cordero (26)|| 18,499 || 47-35
|- style="background-color:#bbffbb"
| 83 || July 8 || @ Indians || 10-0 || Rodríguez (2-0) || Elarton (0-2) || || 24,914 || 48-35
|- style="background-color:#ffbbbb"
| 84 || July 9 || @ Red Sox || 7-0 || Arroyo (3-7) || Benoit (3-4) || || 35,030 || 48-36
|- style="background-color:#ffbbbb"
| 85 || July 10 || @ Red Sox || 14-6 || Lowe (7-8) || Rogers (12-3) || || 35,024 || 48-37
|- style="background-color:#bbffbb"
| 86 || July 11 || @ Red Sox || 6-5 || Shouse (2-0) || Foulke (2-2) || Cordero (27) || 34,778 || 49-37
|- style="background-color:#bbffbb"
| 87 || July 16 || Blue Jays || 11-2 || Drese (5-5) || Halladay (7-7) || || 44,348 || 50-37
|- style="background-color:#bbffbb"
| 88 || July 17 || Blue Jays || 4-0 || Rodríguez (3-0) || Lilly (7-7) || || 43,189 || 51-37
|- style="background-color:#bbffbb"
| 89 || July 18 || Blue Jays || 7-5 || Brocail (1-1) || Chulk (0-1) || Cordero (28)|| 24,334 || 52-37
|- style="background-color:#ffbbbb"
| 90 || July 19 || White Sox || 12-6 || Schoeneweis (6-7) || Benoit (3-5) || || 28,805 || 52-38
|- style="background-color:#bbffbb"
| 91 || July 20 || White Sox || 6-4 || Almanzar (7-1) || Marte (3-3) || Cordero (29) || 27,308 || 53-38
|- style="background-color:#bbffbb"
| 92 || July 21 || Angels || 3-2 || Drese (6-5) || Escobar (5-7) || Cordero (30) || 37,210 || 54-38
|- style="background-color:#ffbbbb"
| 93 || July 22 || Angels || 11-1 || Colón (8-8) || Rodríguez (3-1) || || 23,308 || 54-39
|- style="background-color:#bbffbb"
| 94 || July 23 || @ Athletics || 8-3 || Rogers (13-3) || Mulder (13-3) || || 26,146 || 55-39
|- style="background-color:#ffbbbb"
| 95 || July 24 || @ Athletics || 6-2 || Saarloos (2-1) || Dickey (5-7) || || 25,124 || 55-40
|- style="background-color:#ffbbbb"
| 96 || July 25 || @ Athletics || 9-2 || Harden (5-5) || Wasdin (1-2) || || 25,354 || 55-41
|- style="background-color:#bbffbb"
| 97 || July 26 || @ Angels || 6-1 || Drese (7-5) || Escobar (5-8) || || 42,040 || 56-41
|- style="background-color:#ffbbbb"
| 98 || July 27 || @ Angels || 2-0 || Colón (9-8) || Regilio (0-1) || Percival (16) || 42,625 || 56-42
|- style="background-color:#ffbbbb"
| 99 || July 28 || @ Angels || 2-0 || Lackey (9-9) || Rogers (13-4) || Percival (17) || 41,133 || 56-43
|- style="background-color:#ffbbbb"
| 100 || July 29 || Athletics || 7-6 || Bradford (5-4) || Almanzar (7-2) || Dotel (7) || 31,174 || 56-44
|- style="background-color:#bbffbb"
| 101 || July 30 || Athletics || 7-5 || Francisco (2-1) || Bradford (5-5) || Cordero (31) || 44,116 || 57-44
|- style="background-color:#ffbbbb"
| 102 || July 31 || Athletics || 9-4 || Zito (7-7) || Drese (7-6) || || 50,708 || 57-45
|-

|- style="background-color:#ffbbbb"
| 103 || August 1 || Athletics || 4-1 || Redman (8-8) || Regilio (0-2) || Dotel (8) || 32,646 || 57-46
|- style="background-color:#bbffbb"
| 104 || August 3 || @ Tigers || 5-4 || Francisco (3-1) || Robertson (9-6) || Cordero (32) || 19,894 || 58-46
|- style="background-color:#bbffbb"
| 105 || August 4 || @ Tigers || 8-0 || Bacsik (1-0) || Johnson (8-9) || || 18,857 || 59-46
|- style="background-color:#bbffbb"
| 106 || August 5 || @ Tigers || 2-1 || Drese (8-6) || Yan (1-3) || Cordero (33) || 25,710 || 60-46
|- style="background-color:#ffbbbb"
| 107 || August 6 || @ Orioles || 9-1 || Bédard (5-6) || Regilio (0-3) || || 29,276 || 60-47
|- style="background-color:#ffbbbb"
| 108 || August 7 || @ Orioles || 3-1 || López (9-7) || Erickson (0-1) || Julio (18) || 44,961 || 60-48
|- style="background-color:#ffbbbb"
| 109 || August 8 || @ Orioles || 11-5 || Ponson (7-12) || Rogers (13-5) || || 32,842 || 60-49
|- style="background-color:#ffbbbb"
| 110 || August 9 || @ Orioles || 7-3 || Borkowski (3-2) || Bacsik (1-1) || || 39,850 || 60-50
|- style="background-color:#bbffbb"
| 111 || August 10 || Yankees || 7-1 || Drese (9-6) || Brown (9-2) || || 43,633 || 61-50
|- style="background-color:#ffbbbb"
| 112 || August 11 || Yankees || 4-2 || Sturtze (4-2) || Regilio (0-4) || Rivera (39) || 43,729 || 61-51
|- style="background-color:#ffbbbb"
| 113 || August 12 || Yankees || 5-1 || Hernández (5-0) || Erickson (0-2) || || 48,925 || 61-52
|- style="background-color:#bbffbb"
| 114 || August 13 || Devil Rays || 5-3 || Rogers (14-5) || Bell (5-6) || Cordero (34)|| 30,266 || 62-52
|- style="background-color:#bbffbb"
| 115 || August 14 || Devil Rays || 6-5 || Brocail (2-1) || Núñez (0-1) || Cordero (35)|| 38,620 || 63-52
|- style="background-color:#bbffbb"
| 116 || August 15 || Devil Rays || 6-2 || Drese (10-6) || Sosa (3-2) || || 23,051 || 64-52
|- style="background-color:#bbffbb"
| 117 || August 16 || Indians || 5-2 || Ramirez (4-3) || Sabathia (9-7) || Cordero (36) || 23,551 || 65-52
|- style="background-color:#bbffbb"
| 118 || August 17 || Indians || 16-4 || Erickson (1-2) || Lee (10-5) || Brocail (1) || 24,864 || 66-52
|- style="background-color:#bbffbb"
| 119 || August 18 || Indians || 5-2 || Rogers (15-5) || Elarton (2-3) || Cordero (37) || 31,572 || 67-52
|- style="background-color:#bbffbb"
| 120 || August 20 || @ Royals || 5-3 || Drese (11-6) || Wood (2-5) || Cordero (38) || 17,385 || 68-52
|- style="background-color:#bbffbb"
| 121 || August 21 || @ Royals || 5-3 || Francisco (4-1) || Anderson (2-11) || Cordero (39) || 25,035|| 69-52
|- style="background-color:#ffbbbb"
| 122 || August 22 || @ Royals || 10-2 || Greinke (6-9) || Erickson (1-3) || || 22,286 || 69-53
|- style="background-color:#ffbbbb"
| 123 || August 23 || Twins || 7-4 || Santana (14-6) || Rogers (15-6) || || 23,369 || 69-54
|- style="background-color:#bbffbb"
| 124 || August 24 || Twins || 5-4 || Cordero (3-0) || Nathan (1-2) || || 24,496 || 70-54
|- style="background-color:#ffbbbb"
| 125 || August 25 || Twins || 8-5 || Lohse (7-10) || Drese (11-7) || Nathan (35) || 25,332 || 70-55
|- style="background-color:#bbffbb"
| 126 || August 26 || Twins || 8-3 || Park (3-4) || Mulholland (4-7) || || 26,083 || 71-55
|- style="background-color:#bbffbb"
| 127 || August 27 || Orioles || 6-4 || Wasdin (2-2) || Bédard (5-9) || Cordero (40) || 29,409 ||72-55
|- style="background-color:#bbffbb"
| 128 || August 28 || Orioles || 4-3 || Francisco (5-1) || Ryan (3-5) || Cordero (41) || 41,676 ||73-55
|- style="background-color:#ffbbbb"
| 129 || August 29 || Orioles || 7-6 || Ponson (9-13) || Young (0-1) || Julio (19) || 30,577 || 73-56
|- style="background-color:#ffbbbb"
| 130 || August 31 || @ Twins || 8-5 || Rincón (11-6) || Almanzar (7-3) || || 20,510 || 73-57
|-

|- style="background-color:#ffbbbb"
| 131 || September 1 || @ Twins || 4-2 || Crain (1-0)|| Cordero (3-1) || Nathan (36) || 21,480 || 73-58
|- style="background-color:#ffbbbb"
| 132 || September 2 || @ Twins || 2-0 || Radke (10-7) || Rogers (15-7) || Nathan (37) || 18,293 || 73-59
|- style="background-color:#ffbbbb"
| 133 || September 3 || @ Red Sox || 2-0 || Martínez (15-5) || Wasdin (2-3) || Foulke (27) || 35,151 || 73-60
|- style="background-color:#bbffbb"
| 134 || September 4 || @ Red Sox || 8-6 || Young (1-1) || Wakefield (11-8) || Cordero (42) || 34,670 || 74-60
|- style="background-color:#ffbbbb"
| 135 || September 5 || @ Red Sox || 6-5 || Schilling (18-6) || Drese (11-8) || || 34,652 || 74-61
|- style="background-color:#ffbbbb"
| 136 || September 6 || White Sox || 7-4 || Grilli (1-1) || Park (3-5) || || 31,251 || 74-62
|- style="background-color:#bbffbb"
| 137 || September 7 || White Sox || 10-3 || Rogers (16-7) || Contreras (12-8) || || 20,004 || 75-62
|- style="background-color:#ffbbbb"
| 138 || September 8 || White Sox || 5-2 || García (11-10) || Wasdin (2-4) || Takatsu (17) || 21,836 || 75-63
|- style="background-color:#ffbbbb"
| 139 || September 9 || White Sox || 7-3 || Buehrle (14-8) || Young (1-2) || || 19,384 || 75-64
|- style="background-color:#bbffbb"
| 140 || September 10 || Blue Jays || 10-3 || Drese (12-8) || Batista (10-11) || || 24,617 || 76-64
|- style="background-color:#bbffbb"
| 141 || September 11 || Blue Jays ||10-7 || Mahay (3-0) || Frasor (4-6) || Cordero (43) || 40,587 || 77-64
|- style="background-color:#bbffbb"
| 142 || September 12 || Blue Jays || 7-6 || Brocail (3-1) || Speier (3-7) || Cordero (44) || 20,434 || 78-64
|- style="background-color:#ffbbbb"
| 143 || September 13 ||  @ Athletics || 7-6 || Duchscherer (6-6) || Cordero (3-2) || || 15,535 || 78-65
|- style="background-color:#bbffbb"
| 144 || September 14 ||  @ Athletics || 12-9 || Brocail (4-1) || Redman (10-12) || || 15,644 || 79-65
|- style="background-color:#bbffbb"
| 145 || September 15 ||  @ Athletics || 10-3 || Drese (13-8) || Mulder (17-5) || || 25,849 || 80-65
|- style="background-color:#ffbbbb"
| 146 || September 16 ||  @ Athletics || 5-4 || Harden (10-6) || Rogers (16-8) || Dotel (21) || 15,281 || 80-66
|- style="background-color:#ffbbbb"
| 147 || September 17 || @ Angels || 9-5 || Colón (16-11) || Park (3-6) || || 43,343 || 80-67
|- style="background-color:#bbffbb"
| 148 || September 18 || @ Angels || 2-0 || Ramirez (5-3) || Escobar (10-11)
|| Cordero (45) || 41,233 || 81-67
|- style="background-color:#bbffbb"
| 149 || September 19 || @ Angels || 1-0 || Young (2-2) || Washburn (11-8) || Cordero (46) || 40,099 || 82-67
|- style="background-color:#bbffbb"
| 150 || September 21 || Athletics || 9-4 || Drese (14-8) || Mulder (17-6) || || 28,143 || 83-67
|- style="background-color:#bbffbb"
| 151 || September 22 || Athletics || 5-3 || Rogers (17-8) || Zito (11-11) || Cordero (47) || 29,426 || 84-67
|- style="background-color:#bbffbb"
| 152 || September 23 || Athletics || 5-4 || Nelson (1-2) || Dotel (4-2) || || 23,075 || 85-67
|- style="background-color:#ffbbbb"
| 153 || September 24 || Mariners || 8-7 || Villone (7-5) || Cordero (3-3) || Putz (9) || 32,212 || 85-68
|- style="background-color:#bbffbb"
| 154 || September 25 || Mariners || 5-4 || Dickey (6-7) || Hasegawa (4-6) || Cordero (48) || 48,048 || 86-68
|- style="background-color:#ffbbbb"
| 155 || September 26 || Mariners || 9-0 || Baek (2-4) || Drese (14-9) || || 38,597 || 86-69
|- style="background-color:#ffbbbb"
| 156 || September 27 || Angels || 5-3 || Colón (17-12) || Rogers (17-9) || Percival (31) || 20,333 || 86-70
|- style="background-color:#ffbbbb"
| 157 || September 28 || Angels || 8-2 || Escobar (11-12) || Park (3-7) || || 26,686 || 86-71
|- style="background-color:#ffbbbb"
| 158 || September 29 || Angels || 8-7 || Shields (8-2) || Cordero (3-4) || Percival (32) || 31,538 || 86-72
|- style="background-color:#bbffbb"
| 159 || September 30 || Angels || 6-3 || Young (3-2) || Lackey (14-13) || Dickey (1) || 23,036 || 87-72
|- style="background-color:#ffbbbb"
| 160 || October 1 || @ Mariners || 8-3 || Villone (8-6) || Drese (14-10) || || 45,573 || 87-73
|- style="background-color:#bbffbb"
| 161 || October 2 || @ Mariners || 10-4 || Rogers (18-9) || Moyer (7-13) || || 45,817 || 88-73
|- style="background-color:#bbffbb"
| 162 || October 3 || @ Mariners || 3-0 || Park (4-7) || Meche (7-7) || Cordero (49) || 45,658 || 89-73
|-

|-
| Source: ESPN.com

Player stats

Batting

Starters by position
Note: Pos = Position; G = Games played; AB = At bats; H = Hits; Avg. = Batting average; HR = Home runs; RBI = Runs batted in

Other batters
Note: G = Games played; AB = At bats; H = Hits; Avg. = Batting average; HR = Home runs; RBI = Runs batted in

Pitching

Starting pitchers
Note: G = Games pitched; IP = Innings pitched; W = Wins; L = Losses; ERA = Earned run average; SO = Strikeouts

Other pitchers
Note: G = Games pitched; IP = Innings pitched; W = Wins; L = Losses; ERA = Earned run average; SO = Strikeouts

Relief pitchers
Note: G = Games pitched; W = Wins; L = Losses; SV = Saves; ERA = Earned run average; SO = Strikeouts

Awards and honors
 Alfonso Soriano, 2004 All-Star Game Most Valuable Player
 Alfonso Soriano, Second Base, Silver Slugger Award
 Kenny Rogers, Pitcher, Gold Glove Award
 Buck Showalter, American League Manager of the Year Award
 Mark Teixeira, First Base, Silver Slugger Award

All-Star Game
 Alfonso Soriano, second base, starter
 Francisco Cordero, pitcher, reserve
 Kenny Rogers, pitcher, reserve
 Hank Blalock, third base, reserve
 Michael Young, shortstop, reserve

Texas Rangers Hall of Fame Inductees
Buddy Bell
Ferguson Jenkins
Tom Vandergriff (former Mayor of Arlington, who spearheaded the campaign to bring a Major League Baseball franchise to the Dallas–Fort Worth metroplex)

Farm system

LEAGUE CHAMPIONS: Frisco

References

External links
2004 Texas Rangers team page at Baseball Reference
2004 Texas Rangers at Baseball Almanac

Texas Rangers seasons
Range
Texas Rangers